The 1981 Oklahoma State Cowboys baseball team represented Oklahoma State University–Stillwater in the 1981 NCAA Division I baseball season. The Cowboys played their home games at Allie P. Reynolds Stadium in Stillwater, Oklahoma. The team was coached by Gary Ward in his fourth season at Oklahoma State.

The Cowboys reached the College World Series, finishing as the runner up to Arizona State.

The Cowboys also won the Big Eight Conference championship, the first in a string of sixteen consecutive conference titles which lasted until the league merged with the Southwest Conference.

Roster

Schedule

References 

Oklahoma State
Oklahoma State Cowboys baseball seasons
College World Series seasons
Big Eight Conference baseball champion seasons